"Bookends", also known as "Bookends Theme", is a song by American music duo Simon & Garfunkel from their fourth studio album, Bookends (1968). It appears twice on the track listing, as the first (shortened version) and last (known as the Reprise) songs on side one of the original vinyl LP. "Old Friends" and “Bookends” were placed on the B-side of the "Mrs. Robinson" single, issued on April 5, 1968 by Columbia Records. A "clean" version of "Bookends" (without the segued string from "Old Friends") was featured on Simon and Garfunkel's Greatest Hits.

Background
The "Bookends Theme" that opens and closes side one is played on the acoustic guitar, with no additional instruments. The song is a brief acoustic piece (once compared to English rock band the Moody Blues) that evokes "a time of innocence."

The “Bookends Theme (Reprise)” is preceded by "Old Friends", which segues into the song with a single high, sustained note on the strings. The “Bookends Theme (Reprise)” contains vocal accompaniment from the duo. "The text refers to the passage of time, and to memories of a loved one, and thus fittingly concludes the series of intervening songs, which address interpersonal relationships at times of life that progress from song to song," wrote James Bennighof, author of The Words and Music of Paul Simon. The piece closes the entire suite with the "resigned admonition" to "Preserve your memories / They're all that's left you."

In popular culture
The song was used in the 2009 film (500) Days of Summer.

Notes

References

Sources

 
 
 

1968 songs
Simon & Garfunkel songs
Song recordings produced by Art Garfunkel
Song recordings produced by Paul Simon
Song recordings produced by Roy Halee
Songs about nostalgia
Songs written by Paul Simon